Joseph G. Grifasi (born June 14, 1944) is an American character actor of film, stage and television.

Grifasi was born in Buffalo, New York, the son of Patricia (née Gaglione) and Joseph J. Grifasi, a skilled laborer. Grifasi graduated from Bishop Fallon High School, a now-defunct Roman Catholic high school in Buffalo, when he made the decision that he wanted to be, not just any old actor, but a character actor.

Grifasi has played two New York Yankees elected to the Baseball Hall of Fame: Phil Rizzuto in 61*, set in 1961; and Yogi Berra in The Bronx Is Burning, set in 1977. Grifasi has played defense attorney, later Superior Court Judge, Hashi Horowitz on Law & Order: Special Victims Unit between 2005 and 2018.

Filmography

 On the Yard (1978) - Morris
 The Deer Hunter (1978) - Bandleader
 Something Short of Paradise (1979) - Barney Collins
 Hide in Plain Sight (1980) - Matty Stanek
 Honky Tonk Freeway (1981) - Osvaldo
 Still of the Night (1982) - Joseph Vitucci
 Splash (1984) - Manny
 The Pope of Greenwich Village (1984) - Jimmy the Cheese Man
 The Flamingo Kid (1984) - Mario Minetta
 Brewster's Millions (1985) - J.B. Donaldo
 Bad Medicine (1985) - Gómez
 F/X (1986) - Mickey
 Matewan (1987) - Fausto
 Moonstruck (1987) - Shy Waiter
 Ironweed (1987) - Jack
 Big Business (1988) - Desk Clerk
 The Appointments of Dennis Jennings (1988) - Bartender
 The Naked Gun: From the Files of Police Squad! (1988) - Foreman
 Beaches (1988) - Otto Titsling
 Chances Are (1989) - Omar
 The Feud (1989) - Bud Bullard
 Presumed Innocent (1990) - Tommy Molto
 City of Hope (1991) - Pauly
 Sinatra (1992) (TV) - George Evans
 Primary Motive (1992) - Paul Melton
 Citizen Cohn (1992) (TV) - Gerald Walpin
 L.A. Law (1993-1994) (TV)
 Taking the Heat (1993) (TV) - Lou Valentine
 Benny & Joon (1993) - Mike
 Household Saints (1993) - Frank Manzone
 The Hudsucker Proxy (1994) - Lou
 Naked Gun : The Final Insult (1994) - Director
 Natural Born Killers (1994) - Deputy Sheriff Duncan Homolka
 Heavy (1995) - Leo
 Tall Tale: The Unbelievable Adventure (1995) - Man in Top Hat
 Batman Forever (1995) - Bank Guard
 Two Bits (1995) - Uncle Joe
 Money Train (1995) - Riley
 One Fine Day (1996) - Manny Feldstein
 Sunday (1997) - Scottie Elster
 The Naked Man (1998) - Koski
 The Out-of-Towners (1999) - Arresting Cop
 Switching Goals (1999) (TV) - Dave
 The Other Me (2000) (TV) - Conrad
 Looking for an Echo (2000) - Vic
 61* (2001) (TV) - Phil Rizzuto
 Queenie in Love (2001) - Berthold
 Changing Lanes (2002) - Judge Cosell
 Auto Focus (2002) - Strip Club M.C.
 Bought & Sold (2003) - Alphonso 'Chunks' Colon
 13 Going on 30 (2004) - Mr. Flamhaff
 Slow Burn (2005) - Desk Sgt. Drown
 A Crime (2006) - BIll
 Creating Karma (2006) - Prighorn
 Dark Matter (2007) - Professor Colby
 The Last New Yorker (2007) - Jerry
 Under New Management (2009) - Msgr. Tranni
 Othello (2012) - Brabantio
 A Midsummer Night's Dream (2014) - Peter Quince
 The American Side (2016) - The Serb
 Baked in Brooklyn (2016) - David's Dad
 No Pay, Nudity (2016) - Mr. Davenport

See also
 Law and Order: Special Victims Unit (Seasons 12 to 23.)
 List of Law & Order: Special Victims Unit characters

References

External links
 
 
 Joe Grifasi

1944 births
American male film actors
American male stage actors
American male television actors
Living people
Male actors from Buffalo, New York
American people of Italian descent
Yale School of Drama alumni
Canisius College alumni